"Promised Land" is a song by American Christian hip hop musician TobyMac. The song was released as a single on September 17, 2021. TobyMac co-wrote the song with Adam Agee, and collaborated with Micah Kuiper in the production of the single.

"Promised Land" peaked at No. 9 on the US Hot Christian Songs chart. "Promised Land" received a GMA Dove Award nomination for Short Form Video of the Year (Concept) at the 2022 GMA Dove Awards.

Background
In June 2021, "Promised Land" was reported to be TobyMac's next single following "Help Is On the Way (Maybe Midnight)" which was released in February 2021, with TobyMac expecting its release in September or October. The song was dedicated to TobyMac's grandfather, a miner in West Virginia who died from black lung disease.

TobyMac released "Promised Land" with its accompanying music video on September 17, 2021.

Composition

Reception

Critical response
Jonathan Andre of 365 Days of Inspiring Media gave a positive review of the song, concluding: "Toby’s new song is one of hope and poignancy, and one that can maybe call us into action, too. As we as people living in this COVID-19 world need to ask ourselves where our promised land is, hopefully Toby can bring us into a space where we can be ok with asking the hard question of where our promised land lies, and who it lies in, and if we don’t know where, then why not, and maybe we should just start going on that journey, sooner than later." In his review for Jesus Freak Hideout, Alex Caldwell wrote a favourable review of the single, concluding "With an honest, plainspoken delivery, and with only a hint of a triumphal ending, "Promised Land" flies in the face of most Prosperity Gospel-type teachings, and wisely insinuates that not every challenge or hard time down here will have a traditional happy ending. But TobyMac rightly states that "through the seasons" of life, the Lord is the sustainer, and His presence is the "promised land". The single is a new side of this music veteran and a refreshing bit of honesty in Christian music."

Accolades

Commercial performance
"Promised Land" debuted on the Christian Airplay chart dated September 25, 2021, at No. 49.

"Promised Land" debuted at No. 37 on the US Hot Christian Songs chart dated October 9, 2021,

Music videos
The official music video of "Promised Land" was published on TobyMac's YouTube channel on September 19, 2021. The music video was filmed at Beckley Exhibition Coal Mine in West Virginia, featuring TobyMac as a miner.

On November 25, 2021, TobyMac released the official lyric video of the song.

Track listing

Personnel
Adapted from AllMusic.
 Josh Bailey — A&R
 Chad Chrisman — A&R
 Chris Gehringer — mastering engineer
 Micah Kuiper — background vocals, guitar, producer
 Scott Mills — guitar
 Gabe Patillo — background vocals
 Nick Rad — mixing
 Jon Reddick — background vocals
 Tim Rosenau — guitar
 Tasha Smith — background vocals
 Aaron Sterling — drums
 Andrew Thompson — background vocals
 TobyMac — primary artist, background vocals, producer
 Emoni Wilkins — background vocals

Charts

Weekly charts

Year-end charts

Release history

References

External links
 

2021 singles
2021 songs
TobyMac songs
Songs written by TobyMac
ForeFront Records singles